Gulomjon Abdullaev (born 11 November 1998) is an Uzbekistani freestyle wrestler who competes at 57 kilograms. A 2016 Junior World Championship bronze medalist, Abdullaev qualified to represent Uzbekistan at the 2020 Summer Olympics after sweeping out the 2021 Asian Olympic Qualification Tournament.

In 2022, he won the silver medal in his event at the Yasar Dogu Tournament held in Istanbul, Turkey. He won the gold medal in his event at the 2021 Islamic Solidarity Games held in Konya, Turkey. He competed in the 57kg event at the 2022 World Wrestling Championships held in Belgrade, Serbia.

References

External links 
 
 
 

1998 births
Living people
Uzbekistani male sport wrestlers
Wrestlers at the 2020 Summer Olympics
Olympic wrestlers of Uzbekistan
Islamic Solidarity Games competitors for Uzbekistan
Islamic Solidarity Games medalists in wrestling
21st-century Uzbekistani people